Nikolay P. Serdev, M.D., Ph.D., (b. April 26, 1948) is a Sofia, Bulgaria based board certified specialist in General Surgery and Cosmetic Surgery. He is both Professor and Director of the International University Program in Cosmetic Surgery at New Bulgarian University.

Dr. Serdev is a graduate of the Sofia Medical University, and trained in General and then Cosmetic Aesthetic Surgery at the Military Medical Academy, and Aesthetic Surgery, Aesthetic Medicine Medical Center in Sofia, 1991-1996 he was a deputy head and acting head of the Burns Department in the Military Medical Academy and 2006-2008 National consultant in Cosmetic (Aesthetic) Surgery medical specialty at the Ministry of Health, Bulgaria.

In the early 90s Serdev was the author of a proposed "scarless" closed lifting methods without incisions, in Brazil known as fio elastico. "Beleza questao de atitude" by Mari Fio Bulgaro Fios de Sustentação Guia da plastica Paraenses já podem usar técnica de origem búlgara que tem revolucionado os tratamentos estéticos Tensor / Fio Búlgaro

Professional recognition
 Since 1993 President, National Bulgarian Society of Aesthetic Surgery and Aesthetic Medicine.
 2006-2008 National consultant in Cosmetic Aesthetic Surgery.
 Since 2002 Director of the Board International Academy of Cosmetic Surgery.
 Since 2003 Trustee, Board member International Board of Cosmetic Surgery
 2006 Honorary Professor, New Bulgarian University, Bulgaria and Program Director, International University Program in Cosmetic Surgery.

Selected publications

References

External links
 International Journal of Cosmetic Surgery

Living people
Bulgarian plastic surgeons
Year of birth missing (living people)